Lunacloud is a cloud computing Infrastructure as a Service privider based in Lisbon, Portugal.

History 

It provided cloud computing infrastructure as a service, such as cloud servers and cloud storage, and Cloud Jelastic hosting.

Reception

The performance and cost of Lunacloud's offerings were favourably rated in TechWeekEurope TechRepublic and CloudSpectator when compared to Rackspace and Amazon EC2.

Business model 

Lunacloud had three base products — Cloud Servers, Cloud Storage and Cloud Jelastic. Lunacloud helped design, build, and operate workloads across both environments depending on the individual needs of the customer.

Cloud Servers 
Cloud Servers provided scalable virtual servers using Parallels and VMware.

Cloud Storage 
The API was also compatible with the Amazon S3 API.

Cloud Jelastic 
Cloud Jelastic (acronym for Java Elastic) was an unlimited PaaS and Container based IaaS within a single platform that provides high availability of applications, automatic vertical and horizontal scaling via containerization to software development clients, enterprise businesses, DevOps, System Admins, Developers

Locations

Headquarters
Lunacloud headquarters were in Lisbon.

Customer service centers
 UK: London
 Portugal: Lisbon
 France: Paris
 Spain: Barcelona
 Russia: Moscow

Website

Lunacloud localized storefronts were differentiated by top-level domain and country code:

See also 

 Cloud computing
 Infrastructure as a Service
 Cloud storage

References 

Cloud computing providers
Companies based in Lisbon